The Five Love Languages: How to Express Heartfelt Commitment to Your Mate is a 1992 book by Gary Chapman. It outlines five general ways that romantic partners express and experience love, which Chapman calls "love languages". They are acts of service, gift-giving, physical touch, quality time, and words of affirmation.

Summary 
According to Chapman, the five "love languages" are:
   words of affirmation (compliments) 
   quality time
   receiving gifts
   acts of service
   physical touch

Examples are given from his counseling practice, as well as questions to help determine one's own love languages. According to Chapman's theory, each person has one primary and one secondary love language.

Chapman suggests that to discover another person's love language, one must observe the way they express love to others, and analyze what they complain about most often and what they request from their significant other most often. He theorizes that people tend to naturally give love in the way that they prefer to receive love, and better communication between couples can be accomplished when one can demonstrate caring to the other person in the love language the recipient understands.

An example would be: if a husband's love language is acts of service, he may be confused when he does the laundry and his wife does not perceive that as an act of love, viewing it as simply performing household duties, because the love language she comprehends is words of affirmation (verbal affirmation that he loves her). She may try to use what she values, words of affirmation, to express her love to him, which he would not value as much as she does. If she understands his love language and mows the lawn for him, he perceives it in his love language as an act of expressing her love for him; likewise, if he tells her he loves her, she values that as an act of love.

Reception
The book sold 8,500 copies in its first year, four times what the publisher expected. The following year it sold 17,000, and two years later, 137,000. It was on the New York Times Best Seller list from  2009 to 2013. A new, revised edition of The Five Love Languages was released on January 1, 2015.

A 2006 study by Nicole Egbert and Denise Polk suggests that the Five Love Languages might have some degree of psychometric validity.

Related works
Since 1992, Chapman has written several books related to The Five Love Languages, including The Five Love Languages of Children in 1997 and The Five Love Languages for Singles in 2004. In 2011, Chapman co-authored The 5 Languages of Appreciation in the Workplace with Dr. Paul White, applying the 5 Love Languages concepts to work-based relationships. There are also special editions of the book, such as The Five Love Languages Military Edition (2013) which Chapman co-authored with Jocelyn Green.

References

External links
 

1992 non-fiction books
American non-fiction books
English-language books
20th-century Christian texts
1992 in the United States
1992 in religion
Marriage in Christianity
Relationship counseling
Popular psychology books